Trichilia discolor is a species of plant in the family Meliaceae. It is endemic to Pará state in Brazil. It is threatened by habitat loss.

References

discolor
Endemic flora of Brazil
Flora of Pará
Endangered flora of South America
Taxonomy articles created by Polbot